The Prairie Meteorite Network was a system of sixteen camera stations in Midwestern United States, run by the Smithsonian Astrophysical Observatory from 1964 to 1975. The network used surplus aerocameras with 6.3–12 inch focal length wide angle metrogon lenses that covered a format of 9 x 18 inches on aero roll film. During ten years of network activity only one meteorite fall was recorded, the Lost City meteorite in 1970.

See also
 Glossary of meteoritics
 European Fireball Network

References

Meteorite organizations
History of science and technology in the United States
Former buildings and structures in the United States
1964 establishments in the United States
1975 establishments in the United States